Anaglyptini is a tribe of beetles in the subfamily Cerambycinae, containing the following genera:

 Anaglyptus 
 Aphysotes
 Clytoderus
 Cyrtophorus
 Diphyrama
 Hirticlytus
 Microclytus
 Oligoenoplus
 Paraclytus
 Pempteurys
 Tilloclytus
 Yoshiakioclytus

References

 
Polyphaga tribes